Graham Ellery Vivian (born 28 February 1946) is a former New Zealand cricketer who played in five Test matches and one One Day International (ODI) from 1965 to 1972. He made his Test match debut without previously playing in a first-class match. His father, Giff Vivian, played seven Tests for New Zealand in the 1930s. Both father and son were selected in New Zealand touring teams, in 1930 and 1965 respectively, at the age of 18.

Cricket career
After some fine performances as a leg-spinning all-rounder for the Auckland Under-20 side in the 1964-65 Brabin Tournament (23 wickets at 10.47 in three matches), Vivian was selected to tour India, Pakistan and England in 1965 with the national team. He played his first Test just after his nineteenth birthday, against India in Calcutta, without having played a first-class match. He made a useful 43 in the second innings, coming in when New Zealand were struggling at 103 for 7 and helping the side avoid defeat. On the England leg of the tour he played eight first-class matches but was unsuccessful with bat or ball, and did not play a Test.

He toured the West Indies in 1971–72 and played four Tests but without success. However, his fielding was outstanding: Henry Blofeld described the 1971-72 New Zealanders' fielding as "the most impressive I have ever seen from any side anywhere", and he singled out Vivian as "the best of all". He continued to play domestic cricket in New Zealand until 1978–79, but never played another Test.

Vivian's best first-class bowling figures were 5 for 59 for Auckland against Central Districts at Auckland in 1967–68. On a brief non-Test tour of Australia in 1969-70 he hit his highest first-class score (and first century) of 137 not out against Victoria in Melbourne, out of a New Zealand total of 220, having come to the crease at 22 for 4.

After cricket
In 1981 Vivian established a company manufacturing synthetic turf for sports grounds. By 2007 its New Zealand factory was weaving 950,000 square metres of various kinds of turf a year.

References

External links

1946 births
Living people
Auckland cricketers
Cricketers from Auckland
New Zealand One Day International cricketers
New Zealand Test cricketers
New Zealand cricketers
New Zealand people of Cornish descent
North Island cricketers